Lucas Brunner (born 29 May 1967) is a Swiss chess grandmaster. He was Swiss Chess Champion in 1994.

Chess career
Brunner was born in Bern on 29 May 1967. He moved to West Germany as a child, where he won the German U20 Chess Championship and earned his international master title in 1986. He returned to Switzerland in 1990 and became the first Swiss-born grandmaster when he achieved the title in 1994. He also won the Swiss Chess Championship that year. He is the No. 9 ranked Swiss player as of February 2018.

References

External links

1967 births
Living people
Chess grandmasters
German chess players
Sportspeople from Bern
Swiss chess players